The Chinese Taipei national futsal team represents the Taiwan in international futsal competitions. It is governed by the Chinese Taipei Football Association.

Competition history

FIFA Futsal World Cup

AFC Futsal Championship

EAFF Futsal Championship

Recent Matches

Players

Current squad

Players called for the 2018 AFC Futsal Championship.

Previous squads

AFC Futsal Championship
2018 AFC Futsal Championship squads

Managers

 Damien Knabben (2004)
 Chen Kuei-Jen (陳貴人) (2007–2011)
 Tsai Chia-Feng (蔡佳峰) (2011–2015)
 Chen Yung-Sheng (陳永盛) (2015–2017)
 Adil Amarante (阿迪爾) (2017–2018)
 Chang Chien-Ying (張仟縈) (2018–present)

References

See also

Chinese Taipei national football team

Asian national futsal teams
Futsal in Taiwan
Futsal